Emma Riedl was the editor of the Konsumgenossenschaftliches Familienblatt (English: Consumer Cooperative Family Newsletter), a newsletter published by the German consumer cooperatives of Bohemia (known later as the Sudetenland) between 1921 and 1938.

German journalists
German Bohemian people
Year of birth missing
Year of death missing
Place of birth missing
German women writers
Women print editors